Franky Zapata (born 27 September 1978) is a French personal watercraft pilot who is the inventor of the Flyboard and Flyboard Air, and founder of Zapata Racing. Since 2012, Zapata's efforts have been focused on the development and manufacture of personal flyers for land and aquatic applications.

On 4 August 2019, Zapata crossed the English Channel in 22 minutes, with a refuelling stop at midpoint, on a Flyboard Air. His  journey was completed with an escort from several French helicopters and warships, and aided by a backpack fuel reservoir.

Biography 
Franky started using a Jet Ski at the age of 16. He has won the RUN F1 World Championship several times. After many years of making personal watercraft (PWC), he invented the Flyboard.

He completed an apprenticeship as a mechanic. After gaining experience in jet skiing through competitions and in particular Aquabike World Championship (powerboating), he and his father Claude founded Zapata Racing in 1998 as a high-performance PWC competition team. He shaped shells, steering, arm and saddle-VNM and tuned machines for jet ski races. He has won in PWC competition several European championships and two world champion titles. His Zapata Racing Team develops PWC related products.

Personal life
He is married to Christelle, and has a son Matt.

Zapata Racing Gear 

Zapata started with a budget of 20,000 euros to develop the Flyboard. After several prototypes, he finally managed to stabilize the flyboard by means of underfoot and a hand stabilization in the air. After patenting the invention, he presented the Flyboard for the first time during the World Cup in China. The first flights were recorded and posted on YouTube and received 2.5 million views in just 15 days.

In 2016, Zapata sold Zapata Racing (ZR) to U.S. defense contractor Implant Sciences. In 2017, he provided the U.S. Army with demonstrations of the Flyboard Air (jet-powered hoverboard). A July 2019 news report provided no indication of any serious interest as of that time for the flyboard technology.

Hoverboard by ZR 
Hoverboard by ZR, invented in 2014, is a mix between a surfboard and a skateboard. It is operated by a remote-controlled personal watercraft which powers a water pump. The hoverboard has been discontinued.

JetPack by ZR 
The JetPack is powered by water pumped from a personal watercraft (under remote control) via a tube connected to two nozzles on the flyer. The system allows the user to fly in a seated, secured position and is less dependent on the rider’s balance and dexterity to fly. The JetPack is so stable that, once in the air, a user can even let go of the controls and stay flying in a hovering position.

Flyboard Air 

in April 2016, Zapata unveiled the Flyboard Air, a flight surfboard powered by four micro-turbines equipped with stabilizers to provide its pilots with approximately  approximately ten minutes of flight time. In March 2017, there was a media incident: Zapata flew a Flyboard Air near Marseille Provence Airport  and Airbus Helicopters in Marignane, much to the discomfort of the local flight authority. The Flyboard Air can fly autonomously as a plane and is subject to regulations governing the overflight of airspace.  Zapata flew unknowingly at this time, which led to the official threat of a flight ban and temporarily threatened the further development. Zapata used the incident to raise consumer and investor awareness. By negotiating with  the relevant authorities, including the military, he was allowed to continue development. Further development is planned in the areas of leisure, entertainment, military, medicine and industry.

On July 14, 2019, Franky Zapata participated in the Bastille Day military parade riding his invention, the so-called "jet-powered hoverboard"; that model was powered by five turbines and fueled by kerosene. Three weeks later he succeeded in crossing the English Channel with his device. The previous attempt on 25 July had been unsuccessful, but during the second try on 4 August 2019, escorted by French Army helicopters and using a backpack fuel reservoir, he accomplished the  journey in about 20 minutes, including a fueling stop at the midpoint.

The trip started at Sangatte in the Pas de Calais region of France and concluded at St Margaret's at Cliffe in Kent, UK where he landed safely.

When reporters compared his journey to the first cross-channel flight by Louis Blériot in a monoplane on 25 July 1909, Zapata told BFM television: "It’s not really comparable, he was one of the first men to fly. Let’s just say that I achieved my dream". During a press conference after the crossing he also said, "Whether this is a historic event or not, I’m not the one to decide that, time will tell".

Zapata's company, Z-AIR, had received a €1.3m grant from the French military in December 2018. However, he has said that the flyboard was not yet suitable for military use due to the noise it creates and the challenge of learning how to fly the device.

In 2017, Zapata had provided the U.S. Army with demonstrations of the Flyboard Air (jet-powered hoverboard) referred to as the EZ-Fly in some news reports, which suggested the price per unit might be $250,000. A July 2019 report provided no indication of any serious interest by the American military as of that time for this new technology.

On 5 August 2019, Zapata said that he was working on a flying car and had flown a prototype chassis powered by four gas turbines. "I need to finish building my flying car, I need to introduce it before the end of the year", he told BFM TV after his English Channel crossing.

Competitive accomplishments 
 1996: champion national SKI Stock
 1997: 3rd  at the World Rally Championships raid Oléron RUN F1
 1998: champion European national championships RUN F1
 vice-champion du Monde Rallye Raid Oléron RUN F1
 1999: European champion RUN F1
 2000: Tour US RUN F1.
 2001: King of Bercy - Paris RUN F1
 2003: European vice-champion  RUN F1
 2004: European vice-champion  RUN F1
 3rd  at the World Rally Championships raid Oléron RUN F1
 2005:  European Champion  RUN F1
 2006: European Champion RUN F1, Vice World Rally Champion Oléron Rally RUN F1
 2007: European champion  RUN F1, champion World Rally Championships raid Oléron RUN F1, vice-champion world  de F1 SKI World Finals
 2008: European Champion  RUN F1, World Champion RUN F1 World Finals,  3rd in world championships F1 SKI World Finals
 2009: vice-champion world  F1 SKI, winner of the Cavalaire enduro Jet-Ski F1
 2010: European Champion  RUN F1

References 

1978 births
Living people
21st-century French inventors
French people of Spanish descent
People from Marseille
Aviation history of France
Aviation pioneers
French aviators